Job (Iov), also known as Job of Moscow (d. 19 June 1607) was the first Patriarch of Moscow and All Russia. He is venerated as a saint by the Russian Orthodox Church. He was the Metropolitan of Moscow and all Rus' from 1587 to 1589. He was the seventeenth Metropolitan in Moscow to be appointed without the approval of the Ecumenical Patriarch of Constantinople as had been the norm. In 1589, Jeremias II, the Patriarch of Constantinople, regularized Job's canonical status and raised him to the status of patriarch.

Early life
His birth name was Ioann (a form of John). As a teenager, Ioann knew most of the biblical texts by heart and strove to become a monk. His father, however, insisted that he marry. Once, Ioann asked his father's permission to see his confessor in the Uspensky Monastery in their native town of Staritsa (Tver Oblast). Upon his arrival in 1551, Ioann immediately took monastic vows and assumed the religious name of Job.

Career
Job spent fifteen years in the cloister and finally became its abbot in 1566 with the help of Ivan the Terrible, who had made Staritsa his residence during the time of the Oprichnina. According to Debra A. Coulter, "Job was known as a humble man of impeccable morals, learned for his times, who worked for the good of the church and the promotion of Orthodox Christianity."

In 1571, Job was transferred to Moscow and appointed abbot of the Simonov Monastery. In 1575, he became the abbot of the Novospassky Monastery. In 1581, Job was consecrated as Bishop of Kolomna.

Though a person of mediocre mental abilities, he nevertheless managed to draw the attention of Boris Godunov by his talent for reading the longest of prayers by heart in a very expressive manner. During the reign of Feodor I (whose government was controlled by Boris Godunov), Job was appointed archbishop of Rostov and Metropolitan of Moscow and All Russia in 1587.

Patriarchate
Realizing the necessity of strengthening the ecclesiastic authority in Russia, Godunov managed to persuade the Patriarch of Constantinople Jeremias II to establish a patriarchate in Russia. On 5 February 1589 (26 January, J.C.) Job was elected the first Patriarch of Moscow and All Russia. He exercised all his influence and played a major part in Boris Godunov's ascending to the Russian throne.

Job did not approve, however, of Godunov's proposal to open a university in Moscow staffed with foreign professors because he believed their influence and non-Orthodox faith would spread heterodoxy and endanger the purity of the Russian Church. Under Job's supervision, the Russians corrected books for the divine services and prepared them for publication.

He assisted in the glorification (canonization) of some of the Russian saints, ordering the celebration of the memory of Basil Fool for Christ in 1588, as well as that of Joseph Volotsky and others. Patriarch Job also favored the construction of new cathedrals and monasteries and Christian missionary activities in the recently conquered Astrakhan Khanate and Siberia. He also corresponded with Catholicos Nicholas V of Georgia and exchanged gifts with him. After the mysterious death of tsarevich Dmitry Ivanovich in 1591, Job accepted the non-criminal version of his demise, supporting Boris Godunov every step of the way.

In 1591, he headed the official enquiry into the death of Tsarevich Dmitry in Uglich. After consulting with the church council and the duma of boyars, the patriarch announced his verdict – the tsarevich had accidentally stabbed himself and not been murdered. In that year he also founded the Donskoy Monastery in Moscow.

Civil career
After the death of Tsar Feodor I and the refusal of his wife, Irina Godunova, to accept the throne, Patriarch Job became the head of state in 1598. As he was much obliged to Boris Godunov for his promotion to the post of patriarch, Job offered his candidature as tsar to the Land Assembly (Zemsky sobor). On 21 February 1598, he headed a religious procession to Boris Godunov at the Novodevichy Convent, imploring him to accept the throne.

Job was known as a harsh critic of False Dmitry I and he tried to persuade the people of Moscow to remain loyal to the deceased tsar. The armed supporters of the impostor burst into the Cathedral of the Dormition and a boyar named P. F. Basmanov declared Job a traitor. Job's formal removal from office was on 24 June 1605, when the council announced his retirement because of old age and ill health. The same council announced the grant of the dignity to the Patriarch Ignatius. Job was sent into exile to his monastery in Staritsa, where he went completely blind. Job was succeeded by Archbishop Ignatius of Ryazan and only returned to Moscow following the murder of False Dmitry I, the imprisonment of Patriarch Ignatius at the Monastery of the Miracle and the accession of Vasili IV of Russia. On 20 February 1607, at the request of Tsar Vasili Shuisky, Patriarchs Hermogen and Job jointly celebrated the Holy Liturgy at the Dormition Cathedral in the Moscow Kremlin, where he forgave the people of Moscow and gave them his blessing.

Death
He died a very sick man in 1607. In 1652, Job's relics were transferred to the Cathedral of the Dormition of the Moscow Kremlin, where they remain to this day. Patriarch Job was glorified as a saint by the Russian Orthodox Church in 1989.

References

Metropolitans of Kiev and all Rus' (Patriarchate of Moscow)
Metropolitans and Patriarchs of Moscow
1607 deaths
Burials at Dormition Cathedral, Moscow
17th-century Christian saints
Year of birth unknown
Russian saints of the Eastern Orthodox Church